David E. Hutchison (born July 26, 1943) is a former member of the Wisconsin State Assembly.

Biography
Hutchison was born on July 26, 1943 in New London, Wisconsin. In 1965, he graduated from St. Norbert College. Hutchison is a member of the Knights of Columbus and Ducks Unlimited. He is married with eight children.

Career
Hutchison was first elected to the Assembly in 1994. He is a Republican.

References

People from New London, Wisconsin
Republican Party members of the Wisconsin State Assembly
St. Norbert College alumni
1943 births
Living people